Miconia alpina is a species of tree in the family Melastomataceae. It is endemic to Peru and considered a vulnerable species by the IUCN.

References

alpina
Vulnerable plants
Trees of Peru
Endemic flora of Peru
Taxonomy articles created by Polbot
Plants described in 1908
Taxa named by Alfred Cogniaux